Toprak Razgatlıoğlu (born 16 October 1996) is a Turkish motorcycle racer competing in the Superbike World Championship aboard a factory-team Yamaha YZF-R1. He won the 2021 Superbike World Championship, ending Jonathan Rea's 6-year long reign. Razgatlıoğlu is the first Turkish World Champion in the Superbike history.

Early life
Born in Alanya, Razgatlıoğlu is the second son of famous Turkish stunt motorcyclist Arif Razgatlıoğlu who was known as Tek teker Arif which means Wheelie Arif. His father died, together with his girlfriend who was riding on the pillion seat, following a motorcycle accident in Antalya on 17 November 2017. As a practising Muslim, Razgatlıoğlu stands away during the traditional spraying of Prosecco on the podium following races, due to the prohibition of drinking alcohol in Islam.

Career

Early career
He competed in the Red Bull MotoGP Rookies Cup in 2013 and 2014, finishing 10th and 6th overall respectively. He finished first in the 7th race of the 2014 season in Sachsenring, Germany.

He won his debut race in the European Superstock 600 Championship on 5 October 2014 at Magny Cours aboard a Kawasaki ZX-6R.

He won the 2015 European Superstock 600 Championship aboard a Kawasaki ZX-6R.

Superbike World Championship
Razgatlıoğlu was an upcoming performer with Turkish Puccetti Kawasaki racing team from 2018 and was partnered with factory Kawasaki riders Jonathan Rea and Leon Haslam for the 2019 Suzuka 8 Hours, a track endurance race. Due to not being allowed to ride with the other two taking turns throughout the race, Razgatlıoğlu soon left the Kawasaki marque to become a factory Yamaha rider from 2020. He became World Champion in 2021 after finishing 2nd in Race 1 at the Mandalika International Street Circuit.

Career statistics

Career summary

Red Bull MotoGP Rookies Cup

Races by year
(key) (Races in bold indicate pole position; races in italics indicate fastest lap)

Superbike World Championship

Races by year
(key) (Races in bold indicate pole position; races in italics indicate fastest lap)

* Season still in progress.

See also
 Kenan Sofuoğlu

References

External links

 Page at the Red Bull MotoGP Rookies Cup

1996 births
People from Alanya
Turkish motorcycle racers
Living people
FIM Superstock 1000 Cup riders
Superbike World Championship riders
Turkish Muslims